Teresa Wintermyr is a Swedish female kickboxer and former model, based in Phuket, Thailand. She competes professionally since 2007 and is the current WMC Muay Thai World Bantamweight champion.

Titles

2012 WMC World Bantamweight Championship (1 title defense)

Muay Thai & Kickboxing record 

|-  bgcolor="#FFBBBB"
| 2016-08-12 || Loss ||align=left| Doagmaiparr ||  || Bangkok, Thailand || Decision  || 5 || 2:00 ||   
|-
|-  bgcolor="#FFBBBB"
| 2016-04-16 || Loss ||align=left| Namtarn Por. Muangphet ||  || Yasothon, Thailand || Decision  || 3 || 3:00 ||   
|-
|-  bgcolor="#CCFFCC"
| 2016-03-11 || Win ||align=left| Nung Ning ||  || Phuket, Thailand || TKO ||  ||  ||   
|-
|-  bgcolor="#FFBBBB"
| 2015-08-05 || Loss ||align=left| Saifah Sor Suparat ||  || Chiang Mai, Thailand || Decision  || 5 || 3:00 ||   
|-
! style=background:white colspan=9 |
|-  bgcolor="#FFBBBB"
| 2015-02-21 || Loss ||align=left| Tanya || Sinbi Fight Night || Bangkok, Thailand || TKO  || 4 ||  ||   
|-
|-  bgcolor="#CCFFCC"
| 2014-12-16 || Win ||align=left| Chommanee Sor Taehiran || Sinbi Fight Night || Phuket, Thailand || Decision  || 5 || 2:00 ||   
|-
|-  bgcolor="#CCFFCC"
| 2014-11-29 || Win ||align=left| Saifah Sor Suparat || Sinbi Fight Night || Phuket, Thailand || Decision  || 5 || 2:00 ||   
|-
|-  bgcolor="#FFBBBB"
| 2014-10-27 || Loss ||align=left| Saifah Sor Suparat || Angel Fight Extreme || Bangkok, Thailand || Decision  || 5 || 2:00 ||   
|-
|-  bgcolor="#FFBBBB"
| 2014-07-31 || Loss ||align=left| Hongthong Liangbrasert ||  || Phuket, Thailand || Decision  ||  ||  ||   
|-
|-  bgcolor="#CCFFCC"
| 2014-06-18 || Win ||align=left| Moddaeng Cherngtalay ||  || Phuket, Thailand || Decision  ||  ||  ||   
|-
|-  bgcolor="#CCFFCC"
| 2014-06-08 || Win ||align=left|   ||  || Phuket, Thailand || Decision  || 5 || 2:00 ||   
|-
|-  bgcolor="#CCFFCC"
| 2014-04-13 || Win ||align=left| Duennapa Mor. Ratana Bundit || World Muaythai Angels 16, Third Place Match || Bangkok, Thailand || KO (Knees) || 1 ||  || 
|-
|-
! style=background:white colspan=9 |
|-  bgcolor="#CCFFCC"
|-
|-  bgcolor="#FFBBBB"
| 2014-04-13 || Loss ||align=left| Chommanee Sor Taehiran  || World Muaythai Angels 16, Semi Finals  || Bangkok, Thailand || Decision || 3 || 2:00 || 
|-
|-  bgcolor="#CCFFCC"
| 2014-01-17 || Win ||align=left| Snooker Suhaigym || Muay Thai Warriors || Phuket, Thailand || Decision || 5 || 2:00 ||   
|-
|-  bgcolor="#CCFFCC"
| 2013-11-07 || Win ||align=left| Ilinca Lucia Serbu || World Muaythai Angels 16, Quarter Finals  || Bangkok, Thailand || Decision || 3 || 2:00 ||   
|-
|-  bgcolor="#CCFFCC"
| 2013-10-02 || Win ||align=left| Jessica Sanchez || World Muaythai Angels 16, First Round || Bangkok, Thailand || Decision || 3 || 2:00 ||   
|-
|-  bgcolor="#CCFFCC"
| 2013-08 || Win ||align=left| Petchdara || || Phuket, Thailand || KO (Knee) || 4 || ||   
|-
! style=background:white colspan=9 |
|-  bgcolor="#CCFFCC"
| 2013-06-21 || Win ||align=left| Buagaew Giatsombat ||  || Phuket, Thailand || Decision || 3 || 3:00 ||   
|-
|-  bgcolor="#CCFFCC"
| 2013-05-24 || Win ||align=left| Nong Breeze Sit Dtaibat || Top King Muay Thai || Phuket, Thailand || Decision || 3 || 3:00 ||   
|-
|-  bgcolor="#FFBBBB"
| 2013-04-27 || Loss ||align=left| Laurene Pumpanmuang ||  || Ko Samui, Thailand || Points || 4 || 2:00 ||   
|-
|-  bgcolor="#CCFFCC"
| 2012-11-30 || Win ||align=left| Sonal Pattni ||  || Phuket, Thailand || Decision || 5 || 3:00 ||   
|-
! style=background:white colspan=9 |
|-  bgcolor="#CCFFCC"
| 2012-10 || Win ||align=left|  || Top King Muay Thai || Phuket, Thailand || TKO || 2 ||  ||   
|-
|-
|-  bgcolor="#FFBBBB"
| 2012-08-11 || Loss ||align=left| Kwanjai Pabaijaturat || Queen's Cup || Phuket, Thailand || Decision || 5 || 3:00 ||   
|-
! style=background:white colspan=9 |
|-  bgcolor="#FFBBBB"
| 2012-07-18 || Loss ||align=left| Farida Okiko ||  || Phuket, Thailand || Decision   || 3 || 3:00 ||   
|-
|-  bgcolor="#CCFFCC"
| 2012-05-13 || Win ||align=left| Oronong Bor Petpaiboon ||  || Phuket, Thailand || TKO ||  ||  ||   
|-
|-  bgcolor="#CCFFCC"
| 2012-04-28 || Win ||align=left| Jenjira Giatpetchmonkol ||  || Phuket, Thailand || Decision || 3 || 3:00 ||   
|-
|-  bgcolor="#CCFFCC"
| 2012-03-20 || Win ||align=left| Nong Breeze Sit Dtaibat || Top King Muay Thai || Ranong, Thailand || Decision || 3 || 3:00 ||   
|-
|-  bgcolor="#CCFFCC"
| 2012-01- || Win ||align=left|  ||  || Phuket, Thailand || TKO (Punches) || 3 ||  ||   
|-
|-  bgcolor="#CCFFCC"
| 2011-12-03 || Win ||align=left| Sonal Pattni || Sinbi Muay Thai Event || Phuket, Thailand || Decision || 3 || 3:00 ||   
|-
|-  bgcolor="#CCFFCC"
| 2011-12 || Win ||align=left| ||  || Phuket, Thailand || KO || 2 ||  ||   
|-
|-  bgcolor="#CCFFCC"
| 2011-11 || Win ||align=left| Menang Oleh ||  || Bangkok, Thailand || TKO (Knee to the body) || 1 ||  ||   
|-
|-  bgcolor="#FFBBBB"
| 2011-08-29 || Loss ||align=left|  Iman Barlow ||  || Phuket, Thailand || Decision   || 5 || 2:00 || 
|-
|-  bgcolor="#CCFFCC"
| 2011-08-11 || Win ||align=left| Tuyet Trinh Thi Vu || Queen’s Cup || Bangkok, Thailand || Decision ||  ||  ||   
|-
|-  bgcolor="#FFBBBB"
| 2011-07-09 || Loss ||align=left|  Saifa ||  || Bali, Indonesia || Decision || 5 || 3:00 || 
|-
! style=background:white colspan=9 |
|-  bgcolor="#CCFFCC"
| 2011-06-13 || Win ||align=left| Top King Muay Thai ||  || Phuket, Thailand || TKO (Knee to the body and punch) || 1 ||  ||   
|-
|-  bgcolor="#FFBBBB"
| 2010-10-16 || Loss ||align=left| Serin Murray || Real Deal Muay Thai Kickboxing & MMA || Australia || TKO ||  ||  || 
|-
|-  bgcolor="#CCFFCC"
| 2010-10-06 || Win ||align=left| Petnari ||  || Phuket, Thailand || TKO (Punches) || 3 ||  ||   
|-
|-  bgcolor="#CCFFCC"
| 2010-09-03 || Win ||align=left| Hathai ||  || Phuket, Thailand || TKO (Knee) || 4 ||  ||   
|-
|-  bgcolor="#CCFFCC"
| 2010-08-30 || Win ||align=left|  ||  || Bangkok, Thailand || Decision || 3 || 3:00 ||   
|-
|-  bgcolor="#CCFFCC"
| 2010-03-25 || Win ||align=left|  ||  || Phuket, Thailand || Decision || 3 || 3:00 ||   
|-
|-  bgcolor="#FFBBBB"
| 2009-10-07 || Loss ||align=left| Joey Lee  || Planet Battle VII || Wan Chai, Hong Kong || TKO ||  || ||   
|-
! style=background:white colspan=9 |
|-
|-
| colspan=9 | Legend:

See also
List of female kickboxers

References

Swedish female kickboxers
Swedish Muay Thai practitioners
Living people
Female Muay Thai practitioners
Year of birth missing (living people)
Bantamweight kickboxers
Sportspeople from Stockholm